Austin Trammell (born July 4, 1998) is an American football wide receiver for the Los Angeles Rams of the National Football League (NFL). He played college football at Rice.

College career
Trammell was a member of the Rice Owls for four seasons. He finished his career with 142 receptions for 1,744 yards and 13 touchdowns.

Professional career

Atlanta Falcons
Trammell was signed by the Atlanta Falcons as an undrafted free agent on May 1, 2021. He was waived on August 24, 2021, during the second round of preseason cuts. Trammell was re-signed by the Falcons to their practice squad on September 1, 2021. He was elevated to the active roster on January 2, 2022, for the team's Week 17 game against the Buffalo Bills and made his NFL debut in the game. He signed a reserve/future contract with the Falcons on January 10, 2022.

On June 16, 2022, Trammell was released by the Falcons.

Los Angeles Rams
On August 4, 2022, Trammell signed with the Los Angeles Rams. He was waived on August 30, 2022 and signed to the practice squad the next day. He was promoted to the active roster on December 3, 2022.

References

External links
Rice Owls bio
Atlanta Falcons bio

1998 births
Living people
American football wide receivers
Players of American football from Texas
Rice Owls football players
Atlanta Falcons players
Los Angeles Rams players